The discography of Erik Santos, a Filipino pop singer, consists of five studio albums, one compilation/collaborative album, one extended play, and 26 singles.

Albums

Studio albums

Compilation albums

Extended plays

Singles

Soundtracks

Television theme songs

Film theme songs

Other appearances

Notes

References

Discographies of Filipino artists
Pop music discographies